Zdroje is a municipal neighborhood of the city of Szczecin, Poland situated on the right bank of the river East Oder, south-east of the Szczecin Old Town, and south-west of Dąbie, Szczecin.

Within Nazi Germany, the suburb was the site of Dietrich Bonhoeffer's illegal (after 1937) Theological Seminary of the Confessing Church between 1935–37, and during World War II, the Germans operated a forced labour subcamp of the prison in Goleniów in the district.

References

Zdroje